Nicetas was an 11th-century Greek clergyman. A deacon of St. Sophia, Constantinople, he was a nephew of the bishop of Serres or Serrae in Macedonia. Eventually he became Metropolitan of Heraclea (Pontus), at the end of the eleventh century. He was a prolific writer.

He is sometimes confused with Nicetas Paphlagon.

Works
He compiled catenas on Matthew, Luke and John.

References

Biblical exegesis
11th-century Eastern Orthodox bishops
11th-century Byzantine writers